G. Ayorkor Korsah (formerly G. Ayorkor Mills-Tettey) is a Senior Lecturer in Computer Science and Robotics at Ashesi University in Ghana.

Early life and education
Korsah majored in engineering at Dartmouth College, graduating summa cum laude in June 2003.  She attended Carnegie Mellon University for her doctoral work in computer science, obtaining a PhD in 2011 for her thesis, "Exploring bounded optimal coordination for heterogeneous teams with cross-schedule dependencies".

Career

 2003 – August 2004 
Visiting Lecturer, Computer Science; Ashesi University Computer Science Department, Accra, Ghana

 June – September 2006 
Visiting Lecturer, Ashesi University Computer Science Department, Accra, Ghana

 September – December 2006 
Teaching Assistant; Carnegie Mellon University Robotics Institute, Pittsburgh, PA, USA

Achievements
Korsah and Ken Goldberg, co-founders of African Robotics Network (AFRON), were awarded the 2013 Tribeca Disruptive Innovation Award for their work in founding the network and the "$10 Robot Design” challenge.

Selected publications
 G. Ayorkor Korsah, Anthony Stentz, and M. Bernardine Dias, “A comprehensive taxonomy for multi-robot task allocation”, The International Journal of Robotics Research, October 2013 Vol 32, Issue 12: pp. 1495-1512.
 G. Ayorkor Korsah, Balajee Kannan, Brett Browning, Anthony Stentz and M. Bernardine Dias, “xBots: An Approach to Generating and Executing Optimal Multi-Robot Plans with Cross-Schedule Dependencies,” 2012 IEEE International Conference on Robotics and Automation  (ICRA), May 2012.
 G. Ayorkor Korsah, Jack Mostow, M. Bernardine Dias, Tracy Morrison Sweet, Sarah M. Belousov, M. Frederick Dias, Haijun Gong, “Improving Child Literacy in Africa: Experiments with an Automated Reading Tutor,”  Information Technologies & International Development, vol 6 no. 2, 2010.

See also
 Ashesi University

References

Ghanaian educators
Living people
Dartmouth College alumni
Ghanaian computer scientists
Ghanaian women computer scientists
Ghanaian expatriates in the United States
Carnegie Mellon University alumni
Academic staff of Ashesi University
Year of birth missing (living people)
African women
Women in engineering